The 1996 season was the first season in New York/New Jersey MetroStars's existence, in the first season of American Major League Soccer. They played their home games at Giants Stadium in East Rutherford, New Jersey. The team played 38 matches in the season including 35 Major League Soccer games and 3 friendlies. Eddie Firmani coached the team for their first eight games before being replaced by Carlos Queiroz.

The team is now known as the New York Red Bulls; the entire organization is known as Red Bull New York.

Players
These totals come from 32 league matches and 3 playoff played in 1996. Only displaying players who capped 5 games or more.

Source:

Fixtures

Regular season

Playoffs

Conference semifinals

Friendlies

Source:

Final standings

References

See also
1996 Major League Soccer season

New York Red Bulls seasons
New York New Jersey MetroStars
Metrostars